Diana Ngon is a Ghanaian journalist, communications and media personality. Diana is currently the Northern Regional correspondent of Citi News. She won the 'Best Sensitive Peace Reporter' at the Ghana Journalists Association Awards of the Northern region of Ghana.

Career in journalism 
Diana is currently at Citi FM and Citi TV as an author and journalist in Tamale in the Northern region of Ghana. She reported on the 'Anufos and Konkombas set up peace committee.

Awards 
In September 2019, Diana won the 'Best Sensitive Peace Reporter' at the first edition of the Ghana Journalists Association Awards in the Northern region.

Notable works 
Diana has written articles such as:

 How COVID-19 has unsettled the 'holy' month of Ramadan.
 Sand winning activities threatening White Volta.
 School Feeding Program; Pupils Study Hungry Over Poor Food Quality.

References 

Living people
Ghanaian journalists
Ghanaian women journalists
Ghanaian writers
Year of birth missing (living people)
People from Northern Region (Ghana)